Ivan Vakhushtovich Bagration (Ivane Vakhushtisdze Bagrationi) (1725 – 25 December 1781) was an Imperial Russian general of Georgian royal origin, born in the émigré royal family of Kartli.

Biography 
Ivan was a son of Prince Vakhushti of Kartli, a notable scholar, by his wife Princess Mariam Abashidze. He was, thus, a grandson of two monarchs: Vakhtang VI of Kartli on his father's side and George VI of Imereti on his mother's side. Prince Bagration was commissioned as an officer of the Russian army in 1749. He took part in the Seven Years' War and the Russo-Turkish War of 1768–74 and then commanded corps in Siberia. He was promoted to major-general in 1777 and general-poruchik in 1778, and decorated with the Order of St. George, 4th Class, in 1778. Bagration died in 1781. He is buried at the Annunciation Monastery in Nizhyn, Ukraine.

References 

1725 births
1781 deaths
Imperial Russian Army generals
Georgian generals in the Imperial Russian Army
Georgian lieutenant generals (Imperial Russia)
Russian military personnel of the Seven Years' War
House of Mukhrani